Qaddura Refugee Camp is a Palestinian refugee camp in the Ramallah and al-Bireh Governorate, located just outside downtown Ramallah in the central West Bank. According to the Palestinian Central Bureau of Statistics (PCBS), the Camp had a population of 1,558 inhabitants in mid-year 2006. Qaddura camp was established in 1948, but is not recognized as an official UNRWA camp.

Footnotes

External links
 Welcome To Kaddourah R.C.
Qaddura Camp (Fact Sheet), Applied Research Institute–Jerusalem, ARIJ
Qaddura Camp Profile, ARIJ
Qaddura Camp aerial photo, ARIJ

Ramallah and al-Bireh Governorate
Populated places established in 1948
Palestinian refugee camps in the West Bank